Xenocaligonellididae is a small family of acariform mites of the prostigmatan superfamily Raphignathoidea.

They have been found in China, Mexico, Natal and on the Galápagos Islands.

The two genera are:
 Apocaligonellidus Fan & Chen, 2008 - formerly Echinopsis
 Xenocaligonellidus de Leon, 1959

References
Joel Hallan's Biology Catalog:  Xenocaligonellididae

Acari families
Raphignathoidea